Blackwater: The Rise of the World's Most Powerful Mercenary Army is a book written by independent journalist Jeremy Scahill, published by Nation Books in 2007, as a history and analysis of Blackwater USA, now called Academi. It won one of the 2007 George Polk Awards.

Synopsis 
The book details the rise of Blackwater USA, a private military company, and the growth of security contracting in the Iraq War and the War on Terrorism. In the book, Scahill contends that Blackwater exists as a mercenary force, and argues that Blackwater's rise is a consequence of the demobilization of the US military following the Cold War and its overextension in Iraq and Afghanistan.  He describes further how Blackwater (at the time of writing) serves in Iraq and Afghanistan like, in his judgement, a Praetorian Guard, protecting top authority figures and enjoying immunity from the usual constraints and regulations on traditional armies. Scahill argues that Blackwater's leadership was motivated by a right-wing Republican ideology, and that its founder, Erik Prince, has provided significant assistance in that venue. Blackwater is also allegedly present in some parts of India, although no sources confirm this existence.

Editions 

 2007 U.S. hardcover, Nation Books, 
 2007 U.K. hardcover, Serpent's Tail, 
 2008 U.S. paperback, Nation Books, 
 The book has been translated into Chinese and Arabic.

References

External links 
CBC interview with Scahill about the book
NPR interview with Scahill about the book
Democracy Now! interview with Scahill about the book
Blackwater Founder Implicated in Murder by Jeremy Scahill, The Nation, August 4, 2009
In Explosive Allegations, Ex-Employees Link Blackwater Founder to Murder, Threats - video by Democracy Now!
 Human Rights First; Private Security Contractors at War: Ending the Culture of Impunity (2008)

Blackwater (company)
2007 non-fiction books
Current affairs books
Military books
Books about companies